is a micro-asteroid, classified as a near-Earth object of the Apollo group, approximately  in diameter. Its official first observation was made by the Catalina Sky Survey at Mount Lemmon Observatory, Arizona, United States, on 4 February 2018. Two days later, the asteroid crossed the orbit of the Moon and made a very close approach to Earth.

Orbit and classification 

 belongs to the Apollo asteroids, which cross the orbit of Earth. Apollo's are the largest group of near-Earth objects with nearly 10 thousand known members. It orbits the Sun at a distance of 0.84–1.73 AU once every 18 months (531 days; semi-major axis of 1.28 AU). Its orbit has an eccentricity of 0.35 and an inclination of 8° with respect to the ecliptic. With an aphelion of 1.73 AU, it is also a Mars-crosser, as it crosses the orbit of the Red Planet at 1.66 AU.

The body's observation arc begins with its first recorded observation by Pan-STARRS on 20 January 2018.

Close approaches 

2018 flyby 

Physical characteristics 

The body's physical parameter remain largely unknown. Based on a generic magnitude-to-diameter conversion, and for an absolute magnitude of 26.541, the asteroid measures 15 and 40 meters in diameter, assuming a carbonaceous and stony albedo of 0.057 and 0.20, respectively. No rotational lightcurve has been obtained from photometric observations, and no rotation period, shape or pole has been determined.

Naming 

As of 2018, this minor planet has not been numbered or named.

See also
 List of asteroid close approaches to Earth in 2018

References

External links 

 MPEC 2018-C13 : 2018 CC, Minor Planet Circular, 4 February 2018
 Near-Earth Asteroid 2018 CC approaching the Earth (with image), The Virtual Telescope, 6 February 2018
 Asteroid 2018 CC close approach, International Asteroid Warning Network (IWAN), 4 February 2018
 Watch online as 2 asteroids sweep close this week (2018 CB and 2018 CC), EarthSky, 5 February 2018
 
 
 

Minor planet object articles (unnumbered)
Discoveries by the Catalina Sky Survey
Near-Earth objects in 2018
20180120